Mehdi Norowzian (Persian: مهدی نوروزیان) is an Iranian-British director. He was nominated for an Oscar for his short film Killing Joe (1999) at the 72nd Academy Awards.

Early life
He was born in Iran, and later moved to the UK.

Career
He has directed two films:  Leo (2002) starring Joseph Fiennes and Elisabeth Shue, and Killing Joe (1999) short, which starred Daniel Bliss. In 1997, Norowzian unsuccessfully pursued a lawsuit against Guinness for copyright infringement, citing similarities between their 1994 Anticipation advertising campaign and Joy, a short film present on Norowzian's show reel which he distributed to a number of advertising agencies in 1992.

Filmography

Feature films

Short films

References

External links
Official website

British film directors
Living people
Year of birth missing (living people)
Iranian emigrants to the United Kingdom